Richard Adams Cordray (born May 3, 1959) is an American lawyer and politician serving as the COO of Federal Student Aid in the United States Department of Education. He served as the first director of the Consumer Financial Protection Bureau (CFPB) from 2012 to 2017. Before that, Cordray variously served as Ohio's attorney general, solicitor general, and treasurer. He was the Democratic nominee for governor of Ohio in 2018.

Cordray was raised near Columbus, Ohio and attended Michigan State University. He was subsequently a Marshall Scholar at Brasenose College, Oxford and then attended the University of Chicago Law School, where he was editor-in-chief of the Law Review. In 1987 he became an undefeated five-time Jeopardy! champion.

Cordray was elected to the Ohio House of Representatives in 1990. After redistricting, Cordray decided to run for the United States House of Representatives in 1992 but was defeated. The following year he was appointed by the Ohio Attorney General as the first Solicitor General of Ohio. His experience as Solicitor led to his appearance before the United States Supreme Court to argue six cases. Following Republican victories in Ohio statewide elections in 1994, Cordray left his appointed position and entered the private practice of law. While in private practice he unsuccessfully ran for Ohio Attorney General in 1998 and the United States Senate in 2000. He was elected Franklin County treasurer in 2002 and reelected in 2004 before being elected Ohio State Treasurer in 2006.

Cordray was elected Ohio Attorney General in November 2008 to fill the remainder of the term ending in January 2011. In 2010, Cordray lost his bid for reelection to former U.S. Senator Mike DeWine. He became Director of the CFPB via recess appointment in July 2011 and was confirmed by the Senate in 2013. Cordray left the agency in late 2017 to run for governor of Ohio, an election he lost to DeWine.

Early life and education
Cordray was born in Columbus, Ohio, the middle child between brothers Frank Jr. and Jim, and was raised in Grove City, Ohio, where he attended public schools. At Grove City High School, Cordray became a champion on the high school quiz show In The Know and worked for minimum wage at McDonald's. He graduated from high school in 1977 as co-valedictorian of his class. His first job in politics was as an intern for United States Senator John Glenn as a junior at Michigan State University's James Madison College. Cordray earned Phi Beta Kappa honors and graduated summa cum laude with a Bachelor of Arts degree in legal and political theory in 1981. As a Marshall Scholar, he earned a Master of Arts with first class honors in economics from Brasenose College, Oxford. He was a member of the Oxford University Men's Basketball Team and earned a Varsity Blue in 1983. At the University of Chicago Law School, where he earned his Juris Doctor with honors in 1986, he served as editor-in-chief of the University of Chicago Law Review.

Early career 
After starting work as a law clerk at the U.S. Supreme Court, Cordray returned to his high school to deliver the commencement speech for the graduating class of 1988. He began his career by clerking for Judge Robert Bork of the U.S. Court of Appeals for the District of Columbia Circuit and for Justice Anthony Kennedy of the Supreme Court of the United States. After clerking for Kennedy in 1989, he was hired by the international law firm Jones Day to work in its Cleveland office.

From 1989 to at least 2000, Cordray taught various courses at the Ohio State University Moritz College of Law and Georgetown University.

Ohio House of Representatives
In 1990 Cordray ran for an Ohio State House of Representatives seat, in the 33rd district (southern and western Franklin County), against six-term incumbent Republican Don Gilmore. Unopposed for the Democratic nomination, he defeated Gilmore by an 18,573–11,944 (61–39%) margin.

1992 congressional election
In 1991 the state Apportionment Board, controlled by a 3–2 Republican majority despite the party's 61–38 minority in the state House of Representatives, redrew state legislative districts following the results of the 1990 Census, in the hope of retaking control of the state House. The new boundaries created nine districts each with two resident incumbent Democrats, pairing Cordray with the 22-year incumbent Mike Stinziano. Unable to be elected in another district due to a one-year residency requirement, Cordray opted not to run for reelection.

Cordray ran for Ohio's 15th congressional district in the 1992 U.S. House of Representatives elections, and won the Democratic nomination over Bill Buckel by an 18,731–5,329 (78–22%) margin, following the withdrawal of another candidate, Dave Sommer. Cordray's platform included federal spending cuts, term limits for Congress and a line-item veto for the president. When Deborah Pryce, then a Franklin County municipal judge, announced that she would vote to support abortion rights, Linda S. Reidelbach entered the race as an independent. Thus the general election was a three-way affair, with Pryce taking a plurality of 110,390 votes (44.1%), Cordray 94,907 (37.9%) and Reidelbach 44,906 (17.9%).

Ohio solicitor general
While in private practice in 1993, Cordray co-wrote a legal brief for the Anti-Defamation League, in a campaign supported by Ohio's attorney general, for the reinstatement of Ohio's hate crime laws. This was considered by the U.S. Supreme Court, but not ruled on because of its similarity to a previous Wisconsin ruling.

In 1993 the government of Ohio created the office of state solicitor general to handle the state's appellate work. The state solicitor, appointed by the Ohio attorney general, is responsible for cases that are to be argued before the Ohio Supreme Court and the United States Supreme Court. Until 1998, the Solicitor worked without any support staff. Cordray, who had earlier worked for a summer in the office of the United States solicitor general, was the first Solicitor to be appointed, in September 1993. He held the position until he resigned after Ohio Attorney General Lee Fisher was defeated by Betty Montgomery in 1994. His cases before the Supreme Court included Wilson v. Layne and Hanlon v. Berger. Though he lost his first case, he won his second case, which garnered a substantial amount of media attention for its consideration of the constitutionality of media ride-alongs with police. Other cases included Household Credit Services v. Pfennig, Brown v. Legal Foundation of Washington, Demore v. Kim, and Groh v. Ramirez.

Cordray contested the Ku Klux Klan's right to erect a cross at the Ohio Statehouse after the state's Capitol Square Review and Advisory Board denied the Klan's request during the 1993 Christmas holiday. He argued that the symbolic meaning of the cross was different from the Christmas tree and menorah, which the state permits. The Klan prevailed in the 6th U.S. Circuit Court of Appeals on December 21, 1993, and erected a 10-foot (3 m) cross the following day. The same board denied the Klan a permit to rally on Martin Luther King Day (January 15, 1994) due to the group's failure to pay a $15,116 bill from its Oct. 23 rally and its refusal to post a bond to cover expenses for the proposed rally. When the same 6th U.S. Circuit Court of Appeals overturned the decision to deny the 1994 permit, the state chose not to appeal. The following year the Klan again applied to erect a cross for the Christmas holiday season, and the 6th U.S. Circuit Court of Appeals concurred with the prior ruling. The United States Supreme Court did not agree to hear arguments on the topic until a few weeks after Cordray resigned from his solicitor general position. After his resignation in 1994 he several times represented the federal government in the U.S. Supreme Court: two of Cordray's appearances before were by appointment of the Democratic Bill Clinton Justice Department and two were by the Republican George W. Bush Justice Department.

Cordray was granted a ruling by the Ohio Supreme Court that lower courts could not grant a stay of execution for a death row inmate. At the same time, Fisher, Cordray's boss, sought a referendum to mandate that appeals in death penalty cases be made directly to the Supreme Court. In 1994 the 6th U.S. Circuit Court of Appeals in Steffen v. Tate (39 F.3d 622 1994) limited death row inmates to a single federal appeal and said that federal courts cannot stay an execution if the case is still in a state court.

In early 1996 Cordray was elected to the Ohio Democratic Party Central Committee from the 15th district by a 5,472–1,718 margin over John J. Kulewicz. From 1995 to 2007 Cordray was a sole practitioner and Of Counsel to Kirkland & Ellis.

In late 1996 Cordray, who was in private practice at the time, was a leading contender and finalist for a United States attorney position during the second term of the Clinton administration, along with Kent Markus and Sharon Zealey. Zealey was eventually selected.

1998 Ohio Attorney General election
During the 1998 election for Ohio attorney general, Cordray ran unopposed in the Democratic primary but was defeated, 62%–38%, by one-term Republican incumbent Betty Montgomery.

2000 U.S. Senate election

Cordray entered the U.S. Senate elections in a race that began as a three-way contest for the Democratic nomination to oppose first-term Republican incumbent Mike DeWine. The three-way race was unusual since the three candidates (Cordray, Rev. Marvin McMickle, and Ted Celeste) were encouraged to campaign together in order to promote name recognition, conserve resources and lessen infighting. Ohio Democratic party leaders believed Cordray was better suited for an Ohio Supreme Court seat and urged him to drop out of the Senate race. Despite the Ohio Democrats not endorsing any candidate in the primary election, the entry of Dan Radakovich as a fourth competitor, and the anticipated entry of former Mayor of Cincinnati and television personality Jerry Springer, Cordray persisted in his campaign. Celeste, the younger brother of former Ohio governor Dick Celeste, won with 369,772 votes. He was trailed by McMickle (the only black Senate candidate in the country in 2000) with 204,811 votes, Cordray with 200,157, and Radakovich with 69,002.

Franklin county treasurer

Cordray was unopposed in the May 7, 2002, primary election for the Democratic nomination as Franklin County treasurer. He defeated Republican incumbent Wade Steen, who had been appointed in May 2001 to replace Bobbie M. Hall. The election was close, unofficially 131,199–128,677 (50.5%–49.5%), official margin of victory 3,232. Cordray was the first Democrat to hold the position since 1977, and he assumed office on December 9, 2002, instead of after January 1 because he was filling Hall's unexpired term.

The Franklin County Republican party made no endorsement in the 2004 election, but Republican Jim Timko challenged Cordray. Cordray defeated him and was elected to a four-year term by a 272,593–153,625 (64%–36%) margin.

As Franklin County treasurer Cordray focused on four major initiatives: collection of delinquent tax revenue through a tax lien certificate sale, creation of a land bank, personal finance education, and the development of a community outreach program. He managed a portfolio that averaged $650 million and consistently beat its benchmarks, and set new records for delinquent tax collection in Franklin County, which was the only Ohio county with a AAA credit rating. He also served as president of the Board of Revision and chair of the Budget Commission. In 2005, Cordray was named the national County Leader of the Year by American City & County magazine.

Later career

Ohio treasurer
In the 2006 Democratic party primary election for Ohio treasurer, Cordray was set to face Montgomery County Treasurer Hugh Quill, but Quill withdrew before the election. He defeated Republican nominee Sandra O'Brien for state treasurer in the 2006 election. Cordray succeeded Jennette Bradley in a near-statewide sweep by the Democratic Party. Cordray noted that when he assumed statewide office, Ohio was challenged with restoring public trust after the misdeeds of former Ohio Governor Bob Taft. Referring to what would be required to follow Ohio Attorney General Marc Dann and his interim successor Nancy Rogers, he said: "... we have been patiently rebuilding the public trust there [in the state government] and I think it would be a very similar task there in the Attorney General's office."

Ohio attorney general

2008 election

Cordray announced his 2008 candidacy for Ohio state attorney general on June 11, 2008. He was endorsed by Ohio Governor Ted Strickland. The vacancy in the office of the attorney general was created by the May 14, 2008, resignation of Marc Dann, who was embroiled in a sex scandal. Several leading Republican party contenders such as Montgomery, Jim Petro, DeWine, Maureen O'Connor, and Rob Portman declined to enter the race. Cordray's opponents in the race were Michael Crites (Republican), and Robert M. Owens (Independent). Cordray had a large financial advantage over his opponents, with approximately 30 times as much campaign financing as Crites. Crites's campaign strategies included attempts to link Cordray with Dann—an association The Columbus Dispatch called into question—and promoting himself as having more years of prosecutorial experience. Cordray asserted that he managed the state's money safely despite the turbulence of the financial crisis of 2007–2008.

Ohio statewide offices are regularly contested every four years in the midterm election years. 2008 was a Class 2 senatorial election year, and Ohio is a state with class 1 and class 3 senators. Thus the Attorney General race was the only statewide non-presidential race in the 2008 election aside from contests for two seats on the Ohio Supreme Court. Cordray defeated Crites, 57%–38%.

Tenure
Bank of America

In July 2009 Denny Chin, a judge on the United States district court for the Southern District of New York, granted lead plaintiff status to a group of five public pension funds for investor class-action lawsuits against the Bank of America Corporation over its acquisition of Merrill Lynch & Company. The claim was that Bank of America misled investors about Merrill's financial well-being prior to the January 1, 2009 acquisition despite awareness that Merrill was headed toward a significant loss that amounted to $15.84 billion in its fourth quarter. The suit also alleged that significant bonus payments were concealed.

The curious dealings led to congressional hearings about why the merger commenced without any disclosures. In September 2009 Cordray, on behalf of Ohio's largest public employee pension funds (State Teachers Retirement System of Ohio and the Ohio Public Employees Retirement System), the Teacher Retirement System of Texas and pension funds from Sweden and the Netherlands, filed suit alleging that Bank of America, its directors and four executives (Bank of America Chief Executive Kenneth Lewis, Bank of America Chief Financial Officer Joe Price, accounting chief Neil Cotty and former Merrill chairman and CEO John Thain) acted to conceal Merrill's growing losses from shareholders voted to approve the deal the prior December.

Prior to the filing the five funds had filed individual complaints, but the September filing of an amended complaint joined the actions with Cordray representing the lead plaintiff. The amended complaint included details about conversations and communications between Bank of America and Merrill Lynch executives that were revealed in media reports, congressional testimony and investigations by the Securities and Exchange Commission. The filing was an attempt to recover losses endured when Bank of America's share price fell after the transaction. The damages were sought from Bank of America, individual executives, the bank's board of directors, including any insurers that cover directors' legal liabilities. Among the specifics of the claim were that Bank of America agreed to allow Merrill Lynch to pay as much as $5.8 billion in undisclosed year-end discretionary bonuses to executives and employees and that Bank of America and Merrill Lynch executives were aware of billions of dollars in losses suffered by Merrill Lynch in the two months before the merger vote but failed to disclose them.

Bid rigging case

In April 2010 Cordray reached a $1 billion settlement with American International Group (AIG), one of four remaining named defendants (along with Marsh & McLennan, Hartford Financial Services and Chubb Corp.), in a 2007 antitrust case regarding business practices between 2001 and 2004. The settlement was divided among 26 Ohio universities, cities and schools. Zurich Financial Services settled in 2006. Cordray believes that Marsh was the organizing company for the illegal practices and noted that a trial could commence in 2011. AIG admitted no wrongdoing and said the settlement was to avoid risks and prolonged expenses.

2010 election
On November 2, 2010, Cordray lost his reelection bid to former U.S. senator Mike DeWine by two points.

Cordray was repeatedly mentioned as a potential 2014 candidate for governor of Ohio, but after being confirmed to a five-year term to head the CFPB, he declined to run.

Consumer Financial Protection Bureau (2012–2017)

On December 15, 2010, Special Advisor to President Barack Obama Elizabeth Warren announced that she had selected Cordray to lead the enforcement arm of the newly-created United States Consumer Financial Protection Bureau (CFPB), saying, "Richard Cordray has the vision and experience to help us build a team that ensures every lender in the marketplace is playing by the rules." In announcing his appointment to this position Cordray also said that he intended to once again run for statewide office in Ohio in 2014. Cordray described the opportunity to The Wall Street Journal as a chance to resume "... in many ways doing on a 50-state basis the things I cared most about as a state attorney general, with a more robust and a more comprehensive authority."

On July 17, 2011, Cordray was selected over Warren as the head of the entire CFPB, but his nomination was immediately in jeopardy because 44 Senate Republicans had previously vowed to derail any nominee in order to push for a decentralized structure to the organization. This was part of a pattern of conflict between Republicans in the Senate and the Obama administration that had led to record numbers of blocked and failed nominations. On July 21, 2011, Senator Richard Shelby wrote an op-ed article for The Wall Street Journal affirming continued opposition (that went back to a May 5 letter to the President) to a centralized structure, noting that both the Securities Exchange Commission and Federal Deposit Insurance Corporation had executive boards and that the CFPB should be no different. Politico interpreted Shelby's statements as saying that Cordray's nomination was "Dead on Arrival". In October, as the nomination remained on hold, the National Association of Attorneys General endorsed Cordray. On December 8, 2011, the Senate failed to secure cloture on Cordray's nomination. The final vote was 53–45, with 50 out of 51 Democrats voting for cloture, and 45 out of 47 Republicans voting against.

On January 4, 2012, Obama gave Cordray a recess appointment to the post, bypassing the Senate, which had been holding, over the holiday recess, pro forma sessions of the Senate (gaveling in and gaveling out minutes later, without any legislative business being conducted) in order to block Obama from making a recess appointment. The White House's position was that the Senate was effectively in recess, and therefore that Obama was empowered to make a recess appointment; this move was criticized by Republican senators, who argued that Congress had not officially been in recess, and that Obama did not have the authority to bypass Senate approval.
 
The validity of the recess appointment was challenged by the courts, and in June 2014, in the decision in NLRB v. Noel Canning, the Supreme Court unanimously vacated recess appointments made while the Senate was in pro forma session, determining that the Senate was not in recess at the time of the appointments. This decision did not affect Cordray because, almost two years after the recess appointment, he had been confirmed by the Senate.

On January 24, 2013, Obama renominated Cordray as CFPB director. Senate Republicans opposed his nomination , but amid a July 2013 push by Senate Democrats to eliminate the filibuster for all executive-branch nominees, senators struck a deal to pave the way for a final, up-or-down vote. The Senate voted 71–29 on July 16, 2013, to invoke cloture on Cordray's nomination, and confirmed Cordray in a 66–34 vote the same day.

Republican groups including American Rising Squared and Congressman Jeb Hensarling filed complaints that Cordray had violated the Hatch Act by considering a run for governor of Ohio while serving as the Director of the CFPB, but the United States Office of Special Counsel cleared Cordray of any wrongdoing.

Cordray has said that after President Trump was inaugurated, Trump and Office of Management and Budget Director Mick Mulvaney worked to undermine Cordray and the CFPB. On November 15, 2017, Cordray announced his resignation as director of the CFPB, sparking a legal dispute over who would succeed him as acting director.

2018 Ohio gubernatorial election 
On December 5, 2017, Cordray announced his candidacy for governor of Ohio in the 2018 election. He won the Democratic primary on May 8, 2018, and faced Republican challenger and Ohio Attorney General Mike DeWine in the general election. On August 1, 2018, former President Barack Obama endorsed Cordray for governor. In the November 6, 2018 general election DeWine defeated Cordray with 50.4% of the vote to Cordray's 46.7%; third-party candidates received 2.9%.

Personal life
On July 11, 1992, Cordray married Margaret "Peggy" Cordray, a law professor at Capital University Law School. The Cordrays have twins, a daughter and son, and reside near Grove City, Ohio. His father retired as an Orient Developmental Center program director for intellectually disabled residents after 43 years of service. His mother, Ruth Cordray, from Dayton, Ohio, died in 1980. She was a social worker, teacher and founder of Ohio's first foster grandparent program for individuals with developmental disabilities. Richard Cordray carried the Olympic Flame through Findlay, Ohio, as part of the nationwide torch relay to the 1996 Summer Olympics in Atlanta, Georgia and has served as a member of the Advisory Board for the Friends of the Homeless and part of Al Gore's select group known as Leadership '98.

Appearances on Jeopardy!
Cordray is an undefeated five-time champion and Tournament of Champions semifinalist on Jeopardy! In 1987 he won $45,303 from the show, which he used to pay law school debt, to pay taxes and to buy a used car. The total winnings came from $40,303 in prize money during his five-contest streak and $5,000 for a first-round win in the Tournament of Champions. His campaign for public office in 1990 precluded him from participating in the Super Jeopardy! elimination tournament of champions, as ABC, the network that carried the tournament, had a policy against political contestants appearing on the show (excluding Celebrity Jeopardy!). But he did compete in the Battle of the Decades tournament, appearing in the show aired February 5, 2014, and finishing second to aerospace consultant Tom Nosek. Because of his duties as a federal employee, he turned down the $5,000 he won for that appearance.

See also 
 List of law clerks of the Supreme Court of the United States (Seat 1)
 List of law clerks of the Supreme Court of the United States (Seat 6)

Notes

External links

 Richard Cordray for Governor
 
 
 Richard Cordray at Jeopardy! Archives

1959 births
Living people
Alumni of Brasenose College, Oxford
Jeopardy! contestants
Law clerks of the Supreme Court of the United States
Marshall Scholars
Democratic Party members of the Ohio House of Representatives
Michigan State University alumni
Obama administration personnel
Ohio Attorneys General
People from Grove City, Ohio
People of the Consumer Financial Protection Bureau
Recess appointments during the Obama administration
Solicitors General of Ohio
State treasurers of Ohio
Trump administration personnel
University of Chicago Law School alumni
Candidates in the 2018 United States elections
Biden administration personnel